Oslo University Hospital, Rikshospitalet is one of the four main campuses of Oslo University Hospital in Oslo, Norway. It was an independent hospital, Rigshospitalet, later spelled Rikshospitalet ("The National Hospital"), from 1826 to 2009, when it merged with other university hospitals in Oslo.

It is a highly specialized university hospital with special assignments in research and the development of new methods of treatment. Rikshospitalet is a part of Southern and Eastern Norway Regional Health Authority, and is affiliated with the University of Oslo.

About 60% of the patients admitted to Rikshospitalet are referred from other hospitals in Norway for more specialized investigations and treatment. In Norway, Rikshospitalet plays an important part with expert knowledge of the treatment of rare and complicated disorders.  Rikshospitalet covers the whole country in various fields, including organ and bone marrow transplants, advanced neurosurgery, and treatment of children with congenital malformations. Rikshospitalet is also responsible for health care to the Norwegian Royal Family.

Rikshospitalet had 585 beds as of 2005. It is renowned for its architecture. Rikshospitalet merged in 2005 with the Norwegian Radium Hospital to create Rikshospitalet–Radiumhospitalet. The English form of the name was The University Hospital Rikshospitalet-Radiumhospitalet. Later (in October 2007) the notation was changed to "Rikshospitalet HF" (Rikshospitalet University Hospital HF) and that name now covers what used to be 12 different governmental hospitals (Rikshospitalet, Radiumhospitalet, Geilomo, Strålesatelitt ved Sykehuset Innlandet, Hjertesenteret i Oslo, Epilepsisenteret SSE, Spesialsykehuset for rehabilitering i Stavern, Voksentoppen, Spesialsykehuset for rehabilitering i Kristiansand, Nordagutu opptreningssenter og kvinneklinikken Føderiket), each with their own specialities and now under the same "branding".

The hospital is the last stop on the Ullevål Hageby Line of the Oslo Tramway. Rikshospitalet Station is served by lines 17 and 18. Oslo Heliport, Rikshospitalet  consists of a  diameter helipad  from the emergency department.

History
It was previously located between Ullevålsveien and Pilestredet—roads in Oslo.

1 April 1944, a radio station of The Resistance, located in the loft of Women's Clinic, was raided on 1 April 1944. (Knut Haugland shot four, and escaped.)

It moved to its current location in 1999.

References

Oslo University Hospital
Hospitals in Oslo
University of Oslo
Heliports in Norway
Airports in Oslo
Hospitals established in 1826
1826 establishments in Norway